Camille Sabie (November 25, 1902 – March 20, 1998) was an American athlete who represented the United States in several events at the 1922 Women's World Games, and won gold medals in the 110 yd hurdles and standing long jump and a bronze medal in the conventional long jump.

Early life 
Sabie was born November 25, 1902, in Newark, New Jersey, to David and Angelina Sabie. She graduated from East Side High School, where she was encouraged to be a track star by her parents. Sabie enrolled in Newark Normal School (since renamed as Kean University) and showed was a star in track, especially hurdles.

1922 Women's World Games 
Tryouts were held May 13, 1922, at Oaksmere School in Mamaroneck, New York. At tryouts, Sabie broke the world record for the 100 yard hurdle and came in second in the 50 yard dash. The Games were held on August 20, 1922, and the team placed second. Sabie established another world record in the 100 yard hurdles and also won the standing broad jump. She came in third in the running broad jump. Camille received a hero's welcome when coming home to Newark, greeted by a crowd of over one thousand.

Later life 
After a few more competitions the same year, Sabie taught at Ann Street School. She earned a degree in elementary education from Newark Normal School and then moved to Hawkins Street School where she met her husband George Malbrock, who was later principal of Madison Avenue School.  She married George Malbrock in 1930.  Their daughter Jane Malbrock was born in 1946 and was a professor of mathematics at Kean University. 

Camille Malbrock is listed from at least 1942 through 1963 in yearbooks as a physical education teacher at East Side High School (Newark, New Jersey), and taught for 35 years  

A longtime resident of Millburn, New Jersey, Sabie died March 20, 1998.

References

1902 births
1998 deaths
American female long jumpers
American female hurdlers
East Side High School (Newark, New Jersey) alumni
Kean University alumni
People from Millburn, New Jersey
Track and field athletes from Newark, New Jersey
Women's World Games medalists
20th-century American women
20th-century American people